Yusup Atabayev is a Turkmenistani chess grandmaster.

Chess career
He has represented his country in a number of chess olympiads, including 2008 (where he scored 4/10 on board three), 2012 (4½/10 on board four), 2014 (where the team played no games), 2016 (7/11 on board two) and 2018 (8/11 on board four).

He played in the Chess World Cup 2015, where he was defeated 5-3 by Alexander Grischuk in the first round.

References

External links 

Yusup Atabayev chess games at 365Chess.com

1994 births
Living people
Turkmenistan chess players
Chess grandmasters